Khandala is a town and taluka in the Satara district in the Indian state of Maharashtra.

Geography 
Khandala, Shirwal and Lonand are large towns in the taluka.

The Nira River flows from the northern border. Veer is the largest dam on the river. The southern border is covered by Mahadev Hills. Khandala Taluka is situated on the northern side of Satara district. Khandala is located approximately 55 km south of Pune. It is surrounded by the mountainous region of the Sahyādris. To the east of Khandala  are the talukas of Phaltan and Baramati, to the west lie the taluka of Wai and Bhor, the northern border abuts Purandar Taluka in Pune district and the south border is shared with the Wai and Koregaon.

The headquarters of the taluka is the eponymous city.

History 
Khandala separated from Wai Taluka along with Mahabaleshwar for easier administration.

Demography
According to the 2011 Census, the population is 6,832 souls. 187 are Scheduled Tribes (STs) and 1,090 are Scheduled Castes (SC). The sex ratio is 3,301 females per 3,531 males. The literacy rate in the city is 91.12 per cent, 93.99 for males and 88.08 for females.

Tourism 
Khambatki Ghat gives the best view of Khandala. The ghat is situated on the southern border. Subhangad is a Maratha fort of the Maratha Empire near Shirwal. During the waree of Aashadhi, Ekadashi Palkhi of Shree DNyaneshwar Maauli halts at Lonand. Ashwasnan takes place.Nira River."Shree Datta Temple" is at village Morve.

Wing is famous for agritourism. Madhyavarti Oos Sanshodhan Kendra is situated at Padegaon, where research on sugarcane takes place.

Transport 
Lonand is connected by railway. Khandala and Shirwal are situated on Pune-Satara Highway. Krantisinh Nana Patil College of Veterinary Science is near Shirwal on Pandharpur Road.

Villages
The taluka hosts many villages:
Ahire
Ajnuj
Ambarwadi
Andori
Asawali
Atit
Balu Patalachiwadi
Bavada
Bavakalwadi
Bhadavade
Bhade
Bhatghar
Bholi
Bori
Dapkeghar
Deoghar
Dhanagarwadi
Dhavadwadi
Ghadagewadi
Ghatdare
Golegaon
Guthalwadi
Harali
Javale
Kanhavadi
Kanheri
Karadwadi
Karnvadi
Kavathe
Kesurdi
Khandala
Khed
Koparde
Limbachiwadi
Lohom
Lonand
Loni
Mariaichiwadi
Mhavashi
Miraje
Morve
Naigaon
Nimbodi
Padali
Padegaon
Palashi
Pargaon
Pimpare
Pisalwadi
Rajewadi
Salav
Sangavi
Shedagewadi
Shekhmirwadi
Shindewadi
Shirwal
Shivajinagar
Sukhed
Tondal
Wahagaon
Wadgaon
Waghoshi
Wanechiwadi
Wathar
Wing
Zagalwadi

References 

Cities and towns in Satara district